Lake of the Woods High School is a public high school located in Baudette, Minnesota, United States. The Lake of the Woods School organization operates both an elementary and a high school.

References

External links
 
 Lake of the Woods School

Public high schools in Minnesota
Education in Lake of the Woods County, Minnesota